Blackberry Creek is a stream in Pike County, Kentucky, in the United States. It is a tributary of the Tug Fork, part of the Big Sandy River and thus the Ohio River watershed.

Blackberry Creek was named from the blackberry bushes near its banks.

See also
List of rivers of Kentucky

References

Rivers of Pike County, Kentucky
Rivers of Kentucky